Brenda Blethyn  (née Bottle; 20 February 1946) is an English actress. She is the recipient of several accolades, including a Golden Globe, a BAFTA, a Cannes Film Festival Award for Best Actress, and two Academy Award nominations.

Blethyn pursued an administrative career before enrolling in the Guildford School of Acting in her late 20s. She subsequently joined the Royal National Theatre and gained attention for her performances in Troilus and Cressida (1976), Mysteries (1979), Steaming (1981), and Benefactors (1984), receiving an Olivier nomination for the last.

In 1980, Blethyn made her television debut in Mike Leigh's Grown-Ups. She later won leading roles on the short-run sitcoms Chance in a Million (1984–1986) and The Labours of Erica (1989–1990). She made her big-screen debut with a small role in Nicolas Roeg's 1990 film adaptation of Roald Dahl's The Witches. She experienced a major career breakthrough with her leading role in Mike Leigh's 1996 drama Secrets & Lies, for which she received multiple awards, including Best Actress at Cannes, a BAFTA, a Golden Globe, and an Academy Award nomination. She earned her second Academy Award nomination two years later, for her performance in Little Voice (1998).

Blethyn has since appeared in a range of big-budget and independent features, including Girls' Night, Music from Another Room, Night Train (all 1998), Saving Grace (2000), Lovely and Amazing (2001), Pumpkin, Sonny, Plots with a View (all 2002), Beyond the Sea, A Way of Life (both 2004), Pride & Prejudice (2005), Clubland, and Atonement (both 2007). In addition, she has continued to appear frequently on television, in productions such as Anne Frank: The Whole Story (2001) and War and Peace (2007). Since 2011, she has played the title role of DCI Vera Stanhope in the British crime drama series Vera. From 2020 to 2022, she portrayed the role of Kate Abbott, in the cafe-set sitcom Kate and Koji.

Early life
Born in Ramsgate, Kent, Blethyn was the youngest of nine children in a Roman Catholic, working-class family. Her mother, Louisa Kathleen (née Supple; 10 May 1904 – 1992), was a housewife and former maid, who met Blethyn's father, William Charles Bottle (5 March 1894–c. 1984) in approximately 1922 while working for the same household in Broadstairs, Kent. Bottle had previously worked as a shepherd, and spent six years in British India with the Royal Field Artillery immediately prior to returning home to Broadstairs to become the family's chauffeur. Before WWII, he found work as a mechanic at the Vauxhall car factory in Luton, Bedfordshire.

The family lived in poor circumstances at their maternal grandmother's home. It was, however, not until 1944, after an engagement of 20 years and the births of eight children, that the couple wed and moved into a small rented house in Ramsgate. By the time Blethyn was born in 1946, her three eldest siblings, Pam, Ted and Bernard, had already left home. Her parents were the first to introduce Blethyn to the cinema, taking her to the cinema weekly.

Blethyn originally trained at technical college and worked as a stenographer and bookkeeper for a bank. Towards the end of her first marriage, she opted to turn her hobby of amateur dramatics to her professional advantage. After studying at the Guildford School of Acting, she went onto the London stage in 1976, performing several seasons at the Royal National Theatre. The shows she participated in during the following three years included Troilus and Cressida, Tamburlaine the Great, The Fruits of Enlightenment opposite Sir Ralph Richardson, Bedroom Farce, The Passion and Strife.

Career

1980s 
After winning the London Critics' Circle Theatre Award for Best Supporting Actress (for Steaming) in 1980, Blethyn made her screen debut, starring in the play Grown Ups as part of the BBC's Playhouse strand. Directed by Mike Leigh, their first collaboration marked the start of a professional relationship which would later earn both of them huge acclaim. Blethyn followed this with roles in Shakespearean adaptations for the BBC, playing Cordelia in King Lear and Joan of Arc in Henry VI, Part 1. She also appeared with Robert Bathurst and others in the popular BBC Radio 4 comedy series Dial M For Pizza.

In the following years, Blethyn expanded her status as a professional stage actress, appearing in productions including A Midsummer Night's Dream, Dalliance, The Beaux' Stratagem and Born Yesterday. She was nominated for an Olivier Award for her performance as Sheila in Benefactors. Meanwhile, she continued with roles on British television, playing opposite Simon Callow as Tom Chance's frustrated fiancée Alison Little in three series of the sitcom Chance in a Million. She also had roles in comedies such as Yes Minister (1981), Who Dares Wins and a variety of roles in the BBC Radio 4 comedy Delve Special alongside Stephen Fry and a role in the school comedy/drama King Street Junior.

In 1989, she starred in The Labours of Erica, a sitcom written for her by Chance in a Million writers Richard Fegen and Andrew Norriss. Blethyn played Erica Parsons, a single mother approaching her fortieth birthday who realises that life is passing her by. Finding her teenage diary and discovering a list of twelve tasks and ambitions which she had set for herself, Erica sets out to complete them before reaching the milestone.

1990–1996
After 15 years of working in theatre and television, Blethyn made her big screen debut with a small role in 1990s dark fantasy film The Witches. The film, based on the same-titled book by Roald Dahl, co-starred actresses Anjelica Huston and Jane Horrocks. Witches received generally positive reviews, as did Blethyn, whom Craig Butler of All Media Guide considered as a "valuable support" for her performance of the mother, Mrs Jenkins.

In 1991, after starring in a play in New York City, Blethyn was recommended to Robert Redford to audition for the soft-spoken mother role in his next project A River Runs Through It (1992). A period drama based on the same-titled 1976 novel by Norman Maclean, also starring Craig Sheffer and Brad Pitt, the film revolves around two sons of a Presbyterian minister—one studious and the other rebellious—as they grow up and come of age during the Prohibition era in the United States. Portraying a second generation immigrant of Scottish heritage, Redford required Blethyn to adopt a Western American accent for her performance, prompting her to live in Livingston, Montana in preparation of her role. Upon its release, the film, budgeted at US$19 million, became a financial and critical success, resulting in a US box office total of US$43.3 million.

Simultaneously Blethyn continued working on stage and in British television. Between 1990 and 1996, she starred in five different plays, including An Ideal Husband at the Royal Exchange Theatre, Manchester, Tales from the Vienna Woods and Wildest Dreams with the Royal Shakespeare Company and her American stage debut Absent Friends, for which eventually received a Theatre World Award for Outstanding New Talent. She played character parts in the BBC adaptation of Hanif Kureishi's The Buddha of Suburbia and the ITV cricketing comedy-drama series Outside Edge, based on the play by television writer Richard Harris. Blethyn also performed in a variety of episodes of Alas Smith & Jones and Maigret.

Blethyn's breakthrough came with Mike Leigh's 1996 drama Secrets & Lies. Starring alongside Marianne Jean-Baptiste, she portrayed a lower-class box factory worker, who after years once again comes in contact with her illegitimate grown-up black daughter, whom she gave up for adoption 30 years earlier. For her improvised performance, Blethyn was praised with a variety of awards, including the Best Actress Award at the 1996 Cannes Film Festival, the British Academy Award, a BAFTA Award, a Golden Globe and an Academy Award nomination for Best Actress. Upon its success, Blethyn later stated: "I knew it was a great film, but I didn't expect it to get the attention it did because none of his other films had and I thought they were just as good. Of course, I didn't know what it was about until I saw it in the cinema because of the way that he works—but I knew it was good. That it reached a wider audience surprised me." Besides critical acclaim Secrets & Lies also became a financial success; budgeted at an estimated $4.5 million, the film grossed an unexpected $13.5 million in its limited theatrical run in North America.

1997–1999
The following year, Blethyn appeared in a supporting role in Nick Hurran's debut feature Remember Me? (1997), a middle class suburban farce revolving around a family whose life is thrown into chaos upon the arrival of an old university crush. Forging another collaboration with the director, the actress was cast alongside Julie Walters for Hurran's next project, 1998's Girls' Night, a drama film about two sisters-in-law, one dying of cancer, who fulfil a lifelong dream of going to Las Vegas, Nevada after an unexpected jackpot win on the bingo. Loosely based upon the real experiences by writer Kay Mellor, the production was originally destined for television until Granada Productions found backing from Showtime. Premiered to a mixed response by critics at the 1998 Sundance Film Festival, who noted it a "rather formulaic tearjerker [with] two powerhouse Brit actresses," Hurran won a Silver Spire at the San Francisco International Film Festival and received a Golden Berlin Bear nomination at the Berlin International Film Festival for his work.

In John Lynch's Night Train (1998), Blethyn played a timid spinster who strikes up a friendship with John Hurt's character, an ex-prisoner, who rents a room in her house while on the run from some nasty gangsters. A romantic drama with comedic and thrilling elements, the film was shot at several locations in Ireland, England and Italy in 1997, and received a limited release the following year. The film received a mixed reception from critics. Adrian Wootton of The Guardian called it "an impressive directorial debut [that] mainly succeeds because [of] the talents of its lead actors". The film was nominated for a Crystal Star at the Brussels International Film Festival. In the same year, Blethyn also starred in James Bogle's film adaption of Tim Winton's 1988 novel In the Winter Dark (1998).

Blethyn's last film of 1998 was Little Voice opposite Jane Horrocks and Michael Caine. Cast against type, she played a domineering yet needy fish factory worker who has nothing but contempt for her shy daughter and lusts after a local showbiz agent. A breakaway from the kind at heart roles Blethyn had previously played, it was the character's antipathy that attracted the actress to accept the role of Mari: "I have to understand why she is the way she is. She is a desperate woman, but she also has an optimistic take on life which I find enviable. Whilst I don't approve of her behaviour, there is a reason for it and it was my job to work that out." Both Blethyn's performance and the film received rave reviews, and the following year, she was again Oscar nominated, this time for Best Supporting Actress for her performance.

2000–2003
Blethyn's first film of 2000 was the indie comedy Saving Grace with Craig Ferguson. Blethyn played a middle-aged newly widowed woman who is faced with the prospect of financial ruin and turns to growing marijuana under the tutelage of her gardener to save her home. Her performance in the film received favourable reviews; Peter Travers wrote for Rolling Stone: "It's Blethyn's solid-gold charm [that] turns Saving Grace into a comic high." The following year, Blethyn received her third Golden Globe nomination for her role in the film, which grossed an unexpected $24 million worldwide. That same year, she also had a smaller role in the short comedy Yes You Can.

In 2001, Blethyn signed on to star in her own CBS sitcom, The Seven Roses, in which she was to play the role of a widowed innkeeper and matriarch of an eccentric family. Originally slated to be produced by two former executive producers of Frasier, plans for a pilot eventually went nowhere due to early casting conflicts. Afterwards, Blethyn accepted a supporting role as Auguste van Pels in the ABC mini series Anne Frank: The Whole Story based on the book by Melissa Müller, for which she garnered her first Emmy Award nomination.

Following this, Blethyn starred in the films Daddy and Them, On the Nose, and Lovely & Amazing. In Billy Bob Thornton's Daddy and Them, she portrayed an English neurotic psychologist, who feels excluded by the American clan she married into due to her nationality. The film scored a generally positive reception but was financially unsuccessful, leading to a direct-to-TV release stateside. In Canadian-Irish comedy On the Nose, Blethyn played the minor role of the all-disapproving wife of Brendan Delaney, played by Robbie Coltrane. Her appearance was commented as "underused" by Harry Guerin, writer for RTÉ Entertainment. Blethyn depicted an affluent but desperate and distracted matriarch of three daughters in Nicole Holofcener's independent drama Lovely & Amazing, featuring Catherine Keener, Emily Mortimer and Jake Gyllenhaal. The film became Blethyn's biggest box-office success of the year with a worldwide gross of $5 million only, and earned the actress mixed reviews from professional critics. She also did the UK voice of Dr. Florence Mountfitchet in the Bob the Builder special, "The Knights of Can-A-Lot".

In 2002, Blethyn appeared with Christina Ricci in the dark comedy Pumpkin, a financial disaster. The film opened to little notice and grossed less than $300,000 during its North American theatrical run. Her performance as the overprotective wine-soaked mother of a disabled teenage boy generated Blethyn mostly critical reviews. Entertainment Weekly writer Lisa Schwarzbaum called her "challenged, unsure [... and] miscast." Her following film, limitedly-released Nicolas Cage's Sonny, saw similar success. While the production was panned in general, the actress earned mixed reviews for her performance of an eccentric ex-prostitute and mother, as some critics such as Kevin Thomas considered her casting as "problematic [due to] caricatured acting." Blethyn eventually received more acclaim when she accepted the lead role in the dark comedy Plots with a View. Starring alongside Alfred Molina, the pair was praised for their "genuine chemistry."

A year after, Blethyn co-starred with Bob Hoskins and Jessica Alba in historical direct-to-video drama The Sleeping Dictionary. The film earned her a DVDX Award but received mixed critics, as did Blizzard, a Christmas movie in which Blethyn played the eccentric character of Aunt Millie, the narrator of the film's story. 2003 ended with the mini series Between the Sheets, in which Blethyn starred as a woman struggling with her own ambivalent feelings towards her husband and sex.

2004–2007
Blethyn co-starred as Bobby Darin's mother Polly Cassotto in Beyond the Sea, a 2004 biographical film about the singer. The film was a financial disappointment: budgeted at an estimated US$25 million, it opened to little notice and grossed only $6 million in its North American theatrical run. Margaret Pomeranz of At the Movies said that her casting was "a bit mystifying". Afterwards, Blethyn starred in A Way of Life, playing a bossy and censorious mother-in-law of a struggling young woman, played by Stephanie James, and in the television film Belonging, starring as a middle-aged childless woman, who is left to look after the elderly relatives of her husband and to make a new life for herself, after he leaves her for a younger woman. Blethyn received a Golden FIPA Award and a BAFTA nomination for the latter role.

In early 2005, Blethyn appeared in the indie-drama On a Clear Day alongside Peter Mullan. In the film, she played the character of Joan, a Glasgow housewife, who secretly enrolls in bus-driving classes after her husband's dismissal. Her performance in the film received positive reviews; ABC writer MaryAnn Johanson wrote: "It's Blethyn, who wraps the movie in a cosy, comfortable, maternal hug that reassures you that it will weather its risk-taking with aplomb [...]." The film became a minor success at the international box-office chart, barely grossing $1 million worldwide, but was awarded a BAFTA Scotland Award for Best Film and Screenplay.

A major hit for Blethyn came with Joe Wright's Pride & Prejudice, a 2005 adaptation of the same-titled novel by Jane Austen. Starring alongside Keira Knightley and Donald Sutherland, Blethyn played Mrs. Bennet, a fluttery mother of five sisters who desperately schemes to marry her daughters off to men of means. During promotion of the film, she noted of her portrayal of the character: "I've always thought she had a real problem and shouldn't be made fun of. She's pushy with a reason. As soon as Mr. Bennet dies, all the money goes down the male line; she has to save her daughters from penury." With both a worldwide gross of over US$121 million and several Academy Award and Golden Globe nominations, the film became a critical and commercial success, spawning Blethyn another BAFTA Award nomination for Best Actress in a Supporting Role.

In 2007, she appeared in the independent Australian coming-of-age comedy Clubland. Playing a character that was created specifically with her in mind, Blethyn portrayed a bawdy comedian with a sinking career faced with the romantic life of her young son, played by Khan Chittenden. The film was released in Australia in June 2007, and selected for screening at the prestigious Sundance Film Festival where it was picked up by Warner Independent Pictures for a $4 million deal and gained glowing reviews. Los Angeles Times film critic Carina Chocano wrote, "the movie belongs to Blethyn, who takes a difficult, easily misunderstood role and gracefully cracks it open to reveal what's inside." The following year, she was nominated for an Australian Film Institute Award and an Inside Film Award for her performance.

Also in 2007, Blethyn reunited with Joe Wright on Atonement, an adaptation from Ian McEwan's critically acclaimed novel of the same name. On her role of a housekeeper in a cast that also features Keira Knightley, Saoirse Ronan and James McAvoy, Blethyn commented: "It's a tiny, tiny part. If you blink you'll miss me." The film garnered generally positive reviews from film critics and received a Best Picture nomination at the 2008 Academy Awards. A box office success around the globe, it went on to gross a total of $129 million worldwide. Blethyn also appeared as Márja Dmitrijewna Achrosímowa in a supporting role in the internationally produced 2007 miniseries War and Peace by RAI, filmed in Russia and Lithuania.

2008–2010
In 2008, Blethyn made her American small screen debut with a guest role on CBS sitcom The New Adventures of Old Christine, playing the neurotic mother to Julia Louis-Dreyfus' character in the fourth season episode "Guess Who's Not Coming to Dinner." The same year, she appeared in a single season ten episode of the NBC legal drama series Law & Order: Special Victims Unit. Her performance of a sympathetic fugitive of domestic violence and rape that killed her first husband in self-defense earned Blethyn another Primetime Emmy Award for Outstanding Guest Actress – Drama Series nomination. Blethyn again provided the voice of Mama Heffalump in the animated Disney direct-to-video animated sequel Tigger & Pooh and a Musical Too (2009).

Blethyn's first film in two years, Rachid Bouchareb's London River opened at the 59th Berlin International Film Festival in 2009 where it won a Special Mention by the Ecumenical Jury. In the film, for which Blethyn had to learn French, she portrays a mother waiting for news of her missing child after the London bombings of July 2005, striking up a friendship with a Muslim man, whose child has also disappeared. Blethyn, who had initially felt sceptical and reticent about the film due to its background, was originally not available for filming but Bouchareb decided to delay filming to work with her. Upon release, the film received favourable reviews, particularly for its "dynamite acting". Mike Scott from The Times-Picayune commented "that Blethyn's performance is nuanced [...] it's that performance—at turns sweet, funny and heartbreaking—that ultimately draws viewers in and defies them to stop watching".

Also in 2009, Blethyn played a Benedictine nun in Jan Dunn's film The Calling, also starring Joanna Scanlan and Pauline McLynn. Dunn's third feature film, it tells the story of Joanna, played by Emily Beecham, who after graduating from university, goes against her family and friends when she decides to join a closed order of nuns. Released to film festivals in 2009, the independent drama was not released to UK cinemas until 2010, when it was met with mixed to negative reviews by critics, some of which declared it "half Doubt, half Hollyoaks". Blethyn however, earned positive reviews for her performance; The Guardian writer Catherine Shoard wrote that "only she, really, manages to ride the rollercoaster jumps in plot and tone." Her last film of 2009 was Alex De Rakoff's crime film Dead Man Running alongside Tamer Hassan, Danny Dyer, and 50 Cent, in which she portrayed the wheelchair-using mother of a criminal who is taken hostage. The film received universally negative reviews from film critics, who deemed it to be full of "poor performances, stiff dialogue, [and] flat characters".

2011–present
In May 2011, Blethyn began playing the title role in ITV's crime drama series, Vera as the North of England character Vera Stanhope, a nearly retired detective chief inspector obsessive about her work and driven by her own demons, based on the novels of Ann Cleeves. Initially broadcast to mixed reviews, it has since received favourable reviews, with Chitra Ramaswamy from The Guardian writing in 2016: "Blethyn is the best thing about Vera [...] She has the loveliest voice, at once girlish and gruff. Her face is kind but means business. Not many actors can pull off shambolic but effective but Blethyn can do it with a single, penetrating glance from beneath that hat." Averaging 7.8 million people per episode in the United Kingdom, Vera became one of the best-selling British dramas of the 2010s. Blethyn received the 2017 RTS North East & Border Television Award for her performance and has continued to portray Vera  in 11 series of the show. 

Blethyn's only film of 2011 was the Christmas drama My Angel, written, directed and produced by Stephen Cookson. Also starring Timothy Spall, Celia Imrie and Mel Smith, it tells the story of a boy, played by Joseph Phillips, looking for an angel to save his mother after an accident. Shot in Northwood for less than £2 million, My Angel scooped best film, newcomer, director and screenplay, plus best actor and actress for Blethyn and Spall at the Monaco International Film Festival. In 2012 Blethyn starred opposite singer Tom Jones and actress Alison Steadman in the short film King of the Teds, directed by Jim Cartwright, as part of Sky Arts Playhouse Presents series. She played an old flame who gets in touch with a former boyfriend by Facebook, introducing tensions and doubts from 40 years before.

In March 2013 Blethyn costarred with Hilary Swank in the BBC movie Mary and Martha. Based on a screenplay by Richard Curtis and directed by Phillip Noyce, it involves two very different women, who both lose their sons to malaria. The film received mixed reviews from critics, with Linda Stasi from The New York Post writing that "while Swank and Blethyn make everything they're in more remarkable for their presence, the movie plays more like a based-on-fact Lifetime flick than an HBO work of fiction." Also in 2013 Blethyn began voicing the supporting character of Ernestine Enormomonster in two seasons of the children's animated television series Henry Hugglemonster, based on the 2005 book I'm a Happy Hugglewug  by Niamh Sharkey.

In 2014 Blethyn reteamed with filmmaker Rachid Bouchareb for the French-American drama film Two Men in Town (2014), a remake of the 1973 film. Shot in New Mexico along with Forest Whitaker and Robert Duvall, Blethyn portrays a parole officer in the Western film. Whilst critical reception towards the film as a whole was lukewarm, Sherilyn Connelly from The Village Voice remarked that Blethyn "is wonderful as an all-too-rare character, a middle-aged woman who holds her own in a position of authority over violent men." In January 2015, Blethyn was presented the Lifetime Achievement Award at the 19th Capri Hollywood International Film Festival. 

In 2016 Blethyn lent her voice to the British animated biographical film Ethel & Ernest, based on the graphic memoir of the same name that follows Raymond Briggs' parents through their period of marriage from the 1920s to their deaths in the 1970s. The film earned favorable reviews from critics, who called it "gentle, poignant, and vividly animated" as well as "a warm character study with an evocative sense of time and place." Blethyn received a nomination in the Best Voice Performance category at the British Animation Awards 2018.

From 2020 to 2022, she went on to play Kate Abbott, the cafe-owner in Kate and Koji who developed strong friendships with two asylum-seeking doctors Jimmy Akingbola in Series 1 and Okorie Chukwu in Series 2.

Personal life 
Blethyn married Alan James Blethyn, a graphic designer she met while working for British Rail, in 1964. The marriage ended in 1973.
Blethyn kept her husband's surname as her professional name. British art director Michael Mayhew has been her partner since 1975, and the couple married in June 2010. 

Blethyn was appointed an Officer of the Order of the British Empire (OBE) for services to drama in the 2003 New Year Honours.

Filmography

Selected theatre performances
 Nora in A Doll's House by Henrik Ibsen. Directed by Greg Hersov at the Royal Exchange, Manchester.  (1987)
 Billie Dawn in Born Yesterday by Garson Kanin. Directed by Greg Hersov at the Royal Exchange, Manchester.  (1988)
 Mrs Cheverley in An Ideal Husband by Oscar Wilde. Directed by James Maxwell at the Royal Exchange, Manchester.  (1992)
 Amanda Wingfield in The Glass Menagerie by Tennessee Williams. Directed by Braham Murray at the Royal Exchange, Manchester.  (2008)
 Mrs Berry in Haunted by Edna O’Brien. Directed by Braham Murray at the Royal Exchange, Manchester.  (2009)

References

External links 

 
 
 

1946 births
Living people
Alumni of the Guildford School of Acting
Best Actress BAFTA Award winners
Best Drama Actress Golden Globe (film) winners
Cannes Film Festival Award for Best Actress winners
English film actresses
English stage actresses
English television actresses
English voice actresses
Officers of the Order of the British Empire
People from Ramsgate
Actresses from Kent
20th-century English actresses
21st-century English actresses
English Shakespearean actresses
Royal Shakespeare Company members